Mirzapur is a constituency of the Uttar Pradesh Legislative Assembly covering the city of Mirzapur in the Mirzapur district of Uttar Pradesh, India.

Mirzapur is one of five assembly segments under Mirzapur Lok Sabha constituency. Since 2008, this assembly constituency is numbered 396 amongst 403 constituencies.

Members of Vidhan Sabha
 1962 : Bhagwan Das (Jana Sangh)
 1977 : Rajnath Singh (Janata Party)
 1980 : Azhar Imam (Indira Congress), defeated Rajnath Singh
 1989 : Sarjeet Singh Dang (BJP)
 1991 : Sarjeet Singh Dang (BJP)  
 1993 : Sarjeet Singh Dang (BJP)
 1996 : Sarjeet Singh Dang (BJP)
 2002 : Kailash Chaurasiya (Samajwadi Party)
 2007 : Kailash Chaurasiya (Samajwadi Party)
 2012 : Kailash Chaurasiya (Samajwadi Party)
 2017 : Aryan Singh  (BJP)

Election results

2022

2017
Bharatiya Janta Party candidate Ratnakar Mishra won in 2017 Uttar Pradesh Legislative Elections defeating Samajwadi Party candidate Kailash Chaurasiya by a margin of  votes.

1980 
 Azahar Imam (INC-I) : 26,866 votes 
 Rajnath (BJP) : 15,206

1962 
 Bhagwan Das (JS) : 21,622 votes 
 Amresh Chand (INC) : 21,321

References

External links
 

Assembly constituencies of Uttar Pradesh
Mirzapur